The Beauchamp Falls is a cascade waterfall on the Greaves Creek where it spills into the Grose Valley, located east of the Evans Lookout, approximately  east of  in the Blue Mountains region of New South Wales, Australia.

The falls can be accessed via walking the Rodriguez Pass walking track, part of the Grand Canyon Track, one of the heritage-listed Blue Mountains walking tracks.

The falls were named in 1899 in honour of the then Governor of New South Wales, William Lygon, 7th Earl Beauchamp; it was previously known as the Blackheath Falls.

See also 

List of waterfalls in New South Wales
Blue Mountains walking tracks

References 

Waterfalls of the Blue Mountains
Cascade waterfalls